Nicholas Testa (June 29, 1928 – November 16, 2018) was a professional baseball catcher and coach. He played briefly in both Major League Baseball and Nippon Professional Baseball.

Biography
Testa was born in New York City to Italian immigrants, and was raised in the Bronx.

Testa had one of the briefest major league careers ever. In his one chance on defense, he committed an error. Later that season, Testa was named the team's bullpen coach.

That year, he played in 57 games for the Daimai Orions, batting .136 with five RBI. He also coached baseball at Lehman College.

After retiring from Lehman, Testa joined the New York Yankees as their batting practice coach, serving on five World Championship Teams. Testa died in 2018 at his home in Hastings-on-Hudson, New York, at the age of 90.

See also 

 List of Florida Gators baseball players

References

External links 

1928 births
2018 deaths
American expatriate baseball players in Japan
American military personnel of the Korean War
American people of Italian descent
Baseball players from New York (state)
Daimai Orions players
Dallas Eagles players
Dallas Rangers players
Erie Sailors players
Florida Gators baseball players
Idaho Falls Russets players
Jacksonville Tars players
Johnstown Johnnies players
Little Rock Travelers players
Macon Peaches players
Major League Baseball bullpen coaches
Major League Baseball catchers
Newburgh Hummingbirds players
Omaha Cardinals players
Reno Silver Sox players
San Francisco Giants coaches
San Francisco Giants players
Seaford Eagles players
Sioux City Soos players
Trenton Giants players
Walden Hummingbirds players
Wilkes-Barre Barons (baseball) players
Yakima Bears players
New York Yankees coaches
Burials at Saint Raymond's Cemetery (Bronx)
Lehman Lightning baseball coaches